Hiiu railway station (Estonian: Hiiu raudteepeatus; previous name: Nõmme-Väike) is a railway station in the Nõmme district of Tallinn, Estonia. The station serves the Hiiu sub-district which has approximately 3900 residents. It is located approximately 9 kilometers (5,6 mi) southwest from the Baltic station (Estonian: Balti jaam) which is the main railway station of Tallinn, near the Baltic Sea. The Hiiu railway station is located between Nõmme and Kivimäe railway stations of Tallinn-Keila railway. The station was opened in 1926.

There are two platforms along the two-lane railway, both 146 meters long. Elron's electric trains from Tallinn to Keila, Paldiski, Turba and Klooga-Rand stop at Hiiu station. The station belongs to the Zone I, within which traffic is free for Tallinners.

There is a possibility to transfer to TLT (Tallinn City Transport) bus lines 10, 27 at a nearby bus station on Pärnu maantee. Bus station for bus line 33 is located on Raudtee tänav and Hiiu tänav.

In 1929, a station building made of oil shale ash bricks and with a sloping roof was completed, where in 1932 the postal agency also moved. Ticket sales were terminated at the station building in the spring of 1998. In 1997, the building was declared an architectural monument.

In 2020, there were approximately 58 train departures per day at Hiiu railway station towards Tallinn city center.

See also
 List of railway stations in Estonia
 Rail transport in Estonia
 Public transport in Tallinn

References

External links

 Official website of Eesti Raudtee (EVR) – the national railway infrastructure company of Estonia  responsible for maintenance and traffic control of most of the Estonian railway network
 Official website of Elron – the national passenger train operating company of Estonia responsible for all domestic passenger train services in Estonia

Railway stations in Estonia
Buildings and structures in Tallinn
Transport in Tallinn
Railway stations opened in 1926